Rohan Bopanna and Édouard Roger-Vasselin were the defending champions, but chose not to participate together.  Bopanna played alongside Leander Paes, but lost in the quarterfinals to Ivan Dodig and Marcelo Melo. Roger-Vasselin teamed up with Daniele Bracciali, but lost in the first round to Dodig and Melo.

Pierre-Hugues Herbert and Michał Przysiężny won the title, defeating Dodig and Melo in the final, 6–3, 6–7(3–7), [10–5].

Seeds

Draw

Draw

Qualifying

Seeds

Qualifiers
  Jamie Delgado /  Gilles Müller

Lucky losers
  Pierre-Hugues Herbert /  Michał Przysiężny

Qualifying draw

References
 Main Draw

Rakuten Japan Open Tennis Championships - Doubles